The 5th United States Congress was a meeting of the legislative branch of the United States federal government, consisting of the United States Senate and the United States House of Representatives. It met at Congress Hall in Philadelphia, Pennsylvania, from March 4, 1797, to March 4, 1799, during the first two years of John Adams' presidency.  In the context of the Quasi-War with France, the Alien and Sedition Acts were passed by Congress.  The Acts were overwhelmingly supported by the Federalists and mostly opposed by the Democratic-Republicans.    Some Democratic-Republicans, such as Timothy Bloodworth, said they would support formally going to war against France but they opposed the Alien and Sedition Acts which Bloodworth and others believed were unconstitutional.

The apportionment of seats in this House of Representatives was based on the 1790 United States census. Both chambers had a Federalist majority.

Major events

March 4, 1797 – John Adams became President of the United States 
July 8, 1797 – The Senate expelled Tennessee Senator William Blount for conspiring with the British
July 11, 1798 – The United States Marine Corps was established
XYZ Affair in the U.S., followed by naval skirmishes but no war is declared.  The XYZ affair led to several Democratic-Republicans breaking ranks with Thomas Jefferson.  Jefferson took pains to avoid blaming France for the incident, as a result John Hunter, Josiah Tattnall, Timothy Bloodworth, Alexander Martin, Lemuel Benton, Thomas Sumter, William Smith, John Milledge, Abraham Baldwin, Joseph McDowell, Matthew Locke, Robert Williams, Richard Stanford, Nathaniel Macon, James Gillespie, Dempsey Burges, Thomas Blount, Nathan Bryan, John Brown, Thomas T. Davis, John Fowler and Joseph Anderson all publicly broke ranks with Jefferson, despite the fact he was the de facto leader of their party, and sided with Alexander Hamilton.  The aforementioned congressmen and senators were referred to by Jefferson as a "reign of witches" and were described as the "Pro-British republicans" (as opposed to the "pro-French republicans" led by Jefferson).

Major legislation

 April 30, 1798: The U.S. Department of the Navy was established, Sess. 2, ch. 35, 
 June 18, 1798: Alien and Sedition Acts: ("An Act to establish a uniform rule of naturalization") (Naturalization Act of 1798), Sess. 2, ch. 54, 
 June 25, 1798: Alien and Sedition Acts: ("An Act concerning Aliens"), Sess. 2, ch. 58, 
 July 6, 1798: Alien and Sedition Acts: ("An Act respecting Alien Enemies"), Sess. 2, ch. 66, 
 July 9, 1798: Act Further to Protect the Commerce of the United States, Sess. 2, ch. 68, 
 July 11, 1798: The United States Marine Corps was established, Sess. 2, ch. 72, 
 July 14, 1798: Alien and Sedition Acts: ("An Act for the punishment of certain crimes against the United States") (Sedition Act), Sess. 2, ch. 74, 
 July 16, 1798: Marine Hospital Service Act ("An Act for the relief of sick and disabled Seamen"), Sess. 2, ch. 77,

Territories organized 
 April 7, 1798: Mississippi Territory was organized, Sess. 2, ch. 28, . It was formerly a portion of Georgia and South Carolina

Treaties ratified 

 June 7, 1797: Treaty of Tripoli between the United States and Tripoli.
 July 7, 1797: Existing treaties with France were rescinded, Sess. 2, ch. 67,

Party summary 
Details on changes are shown below in the "Changes in membership" section.

Senate

House of Representatives

Leadership

Senate
President: Thomas Jefferson (DR)
 President pro tempore: William Bradford (F), elected July 6, 1797
 Jacob Read (F), elected November 22, 1797
 Theodore Sedgwick (F), elected June 27, 1798
 John Laurance (F), elected December 6, 1798
 James Ross (F), elected March 1, 1799

House of Representatives 
 Speaker: Jonathan Dayton (F)

Members
This list is arranged by chamber, then by state. Senators are listed in order of seniority, and representatives are listed by district.

Senate
Senators were elected by the state legislatures every two years, with one-third beginning new six-year terms with each Congress. Preceding the names in the list below are Senate class numbers, which indicate the cycle of their election. In this Congress, Class 1 meant their term began in this Congress, requiring reelection in 1802; Class 2 meant their term ended with this Congress, requiring reelection in 1798; and Class 3 meant their term began in the last Congress, requiring reelection in 1800.

Skip to House of Representatives, below

Connecticut 
1. James Hillhouse (F)
3. Uriah Tracy (F)

Delaware 
1. Henry Latimer (F)
2. John Vining (F), until January 19, 1798
 Joshua Clayton (F), from January 19, 1798, until August 11, 1798
 William H. Wells (F), from January 17, 1799

Georgia 
2. Josiah Tattnall (DR)
3. James Gunn (F)

Kentucky 
2. John Brown (DR)
3. Humphrey Marshall (F)

Maryland 
1. John Eager Howard (F)
3. John Henry (F), until December 10, 1797
 James Lloyd (F), from December 11, 1797

Massachusetts 
1. Benjamin Goodhue (F)
2. Theodore Sedgwick (F)

New Hampshire 
2. Samuel Livermore (F)
3. John Langdon (DR)

New Jersey 
1. John Rutherfurd (F), until November 26, 1798
 Franklin Davenport (F), from December 5, 1798
2. Richard Stockton (F)

New York 
1. Philip Schuyler (F), until January 3, 1798
 John Sloss Hobart (F), from January 11, 1798, until April 16, 1798
 William North (F), from May 5, 1798, until August 17, 1798
 James Watson (F), from August 17, 1798
3. John Laurance (F)

North Carolina 
2. Alexander Martin (DR)
3. Timothy Bloodworth (DR)

Pennsylvania 
1. James Ross (F)
3. William Bingham (F)

Rhode Island 
1. Theodore Foster (F)
2. William Bradford (F), until October ????, 1797
 Ray Greene (F), from November 13, 1797

South Carolina 
2. John Hunter (DR) until November 26, 1798
 Charles Pinckney (DR), from December 6, 1798
3. Jacob Read (F)

Tennessee 
1. William Cocke (DR), May 15, 1797 - September 26, 1797
 Andrew Jackson (DR), September 26, 1797 - April ????, 1798
 Daniel Smith (DR), from October 6, 1798
2. William Blount (DR), until July 8, 1797
 Joseph Anderson (DR), from September 26, 1797

Vermont 
1. Isaac Tichenor (F), until October 17, 1797
 Nathaniel Chipman (F), from October 17, 1797
3. Elijah Paine (F)

Virginia 
1. Stevens T. Mason (DR)
2. Henry Tazewell (DR), until January 24, 1799

House of Representatives

Connecticut 
All representatives were elected statewide on a general ticket.
 . John Allen (F)
 . Joshua Coit (F), until September 5, 1798
 Jonathan Brace (F), from December 3, 1798
 . Samuel W. Dana (F)
 . James Davenport (F), until August 3, 1797
 William Edmond (F), from November 13, 1797
 . Chauncey Goodrich (F)
 . Roger Griswold (F)
 . Nathaniel Smith (F)

Delaware 
 . James A. Bayard (F)

Georgia 
Both representatives were elected statewide on a general ticket.
 . Abraham Baldwin (DR)
 . John Milledge (DR)

Kentucky 
 . Thomas T. Davis (DR)
 . John Fowler (DR)

Maryland 
 . George Dent (F)
 . Richard Sprigg Jr. (DR)
 . William Craik (F)
 . George Baer Jr. (F)
 . Samuel Smith (DR)
 . William Matthews (F)
 . William Hindman (F)
 . John Dennis (F)

Massachusetts 
 . Thomson J. Skinner (DR)
 . William Shepard (F)
 . Samuel Lyman (F)
 . Dwight Foster (F)
 . Nathaniel Freeman Jr. (DR)
 . John Reed Sr. (F)
 . Stephen Bullock (F)
 . Harrison Gray Otis (F)
 . Joseph Bradley Varnum (DR)
 . Samuel Sewall (F)
 . Theophilus Bradbury (F), until July 24, 1797
 Bailey Bartlett (F), from November 27, 1797
 . Isaac Parker (F)
 . Peleg Wadsworth (F)
 . George Thatcher (F)

New Hampshire 
All representatives were elected statewide on a general ticket.
 . Abiel Foster (F)
 . Jonathan Freeman (F)
 . William Gordon (F)
 . Jeremiah Smith (F), until July 26, 1797
 Peleg Sprague (F), from December 15, 1797

New Jersey 
All representatives were elected statewide on a general ticket.
 . Jonathan Dayton (F)
 . James H. Imlay (F)
 . James Schureman (F)
 . Thomas Sinnickson (F)
 . Mark Thomson (F)

New York 
 . Jonathan N. Havens (DR)
 . Edward Livingston (DR)
 . Philip Van Cortlandt (DR)
 . Lucas C. Elmendorf (DR)
 . David Brooks (F)
 . Hezekiah L. Hosmer (F)
 . John E. Van Alen (F)
 . Henry Glen (F)
 . John Williams (F)
 . James Cochran (F)

North Carolina 
 . Joseph McDowell (DR)
 . Matthew Locke (DR)
 . Robert Williams (DR)
 . Richard Stanford (DR)
 . Nathaniel Macon (DR)
 . James Gillespie (DR)
 . William Barry Grove (F)
 . Dempsey Burges (DR)
 . Thomas Blount (DR)
 . Nathan Bryan (DR), until June 4, 1798
 Richard Dobbs Spaight (DR), from December 10, 1798

Pennsylvania 
The 4th district was a plural district with two representatives.
 . John Swanwick (DR), until July 31, 1798
 Robert Waln (F), from December 3, 1798
 . Blair McClenachan (DR)
 . Richard Thomas (F)
 . John Chapman (F)
 . Samuel Sitgreaves (F), until 1798
 Robert Brown (DR), from December 4, 1798
 . George Ege (F), until October 1797
 Joseph Hiester (DR), from December 1, 1797
 . John A. Hanna (DR)
 . John Wilkes Kittera (F)
 . Thomas Hartley (F)
 . Andrew Gregg (DR)
 . David Bard (DR)
 . William Findley (DR)
 . Albert Gallatin (DR)

Rhode Island 
Both representatives were elected statewide on a general ticket.
 . Christopher G. Champlin (F)
 . Elisha R. Potter (F), until 1797
 Thomas Tillinghast (F), from November 13, 1797

South Carolina 
 . William L. Smith (F), until July 10, 1797
 Thomas Pinckney (F), from November 23, 1797
 . John Rutledge Jr. (F)
 . Lemuel Benton (DR)
 . Thomas Sumter (DR)
 . Robert Goodloe Harper (F)
 . William Smith (DR)

Tennessee 
 . Andrew Jackson (DR), until September, 1797
 William C. C. Claiborne (DR), from November 23, 1797

Vermont 
 . Matthew Lyon (DR)
 . Lewis R. Morris (F), from May 24, 1797

Virginia 
 . Daniel Morgan (F)
 . David Holmes (DR)
 . James Machir (F)
 . Abram Trigg (DR)
 . John J. Trigg (DR)
 . Matthew Clay (DR)
 . Abraham B. Venable (DR)
 . Thomas Claiborne (DR)
 . William B. Giles (DR), until October 2, 1798
 Joseph Eggleston (DR), from December 3, 1798
 . Carter B. Harrison (DR)
 . Josiah Parker (F)
 . Thomas Evans (F)
 . John Clopton (DR)
 . Samuel J. Cabell (DR)
 . John Dawson (DR)
 . Anthony New (DR)
 . Richard Brent (DR)
 . John Nicholas (DR)
 . Walter Jones (DR)

Changes in membership
The count below reflects changes from the beginning of this Congress

Senate 
There were 9 resignations, 2 deaths, 1 expulsion, 1 late selection, and 2 elections to replace appointees. Neither party had a net gain of seats.

|-
| Tennessee(1)
| Vacant
| Tennessee failed to elect a Senator on time
|  | William Cocke (DR)
| Appointed May 15, 1797

|-
| Tennessee(2)
|  | William Blount (DR)
| Expelled July 8, 1797
|  | Joseph Anderson (DR)
| Elected September 26, 1797

|-
| Tennessee(1)
|  | William Cocke (DR)
| Interim appointment until September 26, 1797
|  | Andrew Jackson (DR)
| Elected September 26, 1797

|-
| Rhode Island(2)
|  | William Bradford (F)
| Resigned sometime in October, 1797
|  | Ray Greene (F)
| Elected November 13, 1797

|-
| Vermont(1)
|  | Isaac Tichenor (F)
| Resigned October 17, 1797
|  | Nathaniel Chipman (F)
| Elected October 17, 1797

|-
| Maryland(3)
|  | John Henry (F)
| Resigned December 10, 1797
|  | James Lloyd (F)
| Elected December 11, 1797

|-
| New York(1)
|  | Philip John Schuyler (F)
| Resigned January 3, 1798
|  | John Sloss Hobart (F)
| Elected January 11, 1798

|-
| Delaware(2)
|  | John Vining (F)
| Resigned January 19, 1798
|  | Joshua Clayton (F)
| Elected January 19, 1798

|-
| Tennessee(1)
|  | Andrew Jackson (DR)
| Resigned sometime in April, 1798
|  | Daniel Smith (DR)
| Appointed October 6, 1798

|-
| New York(1)
|  | John Sloss Hobart (F)
| Resigned April 16, 1798
|  | William North (F)
| Appointed May 5, 1798

|-
| Delaware(2)
|  | Joshua Clayton (F)
| Died August 11, 1798
|  | William H. Wells (F)
| Elected January 17, 1799

|-
| New York(1)
|  | William North (F)
| Interim appointment until August 17, 1798
|  | James Watson (F)
| Elected August 17, 1798

|-
| New Jersey(1)
|  | John Rutherfurd (F)
| Resigned November 26, 1798
|  | Franklin Davenport (F)
| Appointed December 5, 1798

|-
| South Carolina(2)
|  | John Hunter (DR)
| Resigned November 26, 1798
|  | Charles Pinckney (DR)
| Elected December 6, 1798

|-
| Virginia(2)
|  | Henry Tazewell (DR)
| Died January 24, 1799
| Vacant
| Not filled in this Congress
|}

House of Representatives 
There were 9 resignations and 3 deaths. The Federalists had a 1-seat net loss and the Democratic-Republicans had a 1-seat net gain.

|-
| 
|  | Vacant
| Daniel Buck (F) had been re-elected, but declined to serve.Successor elected May 23, 1797.
|  | Lewis R. Morris (F)
| May 24, 1797

|-
| 
|  | Elisha Potter (F)
| Resigned sometime in 1797.Successor elected August 29, 1797.
|  | Thomas Tillinghast (F)
| Seated November 13, 1797

|-
| 
|  | William L. Smith (F)
| Resigned July 10, 1797.Successor elected September 4–5, 1797.
|  | Thomas Pinckney (F)
| Seated November 23, 1797

|-
| 
|  | Theophilus Bradbury (F)
| Resigned July 24, 1797.Successor elected August 4, 1797.
|  | Bailey Bartlett (F)
| Seated November 27, 1797

|-
| 
|  | Jeremiah Smith (F)
| Resigned July 26, 1797.Successor elected August 28, 1797.
|  | Peleg Sprague (F)
| Seated December 15, 1797

|-
| 
|  | James Davenport (F)
| Died August 3, 1797.Successor elected September 18, 1797.
|  | William Edmond (F)
| Seated November 13, 1797

|-
| 
|  | Andrew Jackson (DR)
| Resigned sometime in September 1797 to become U.S. Senator.Successor elected September 26, 1797.
|  | William C.C. Claiborne (DR)
| Seated November 23, 1797

|-
| 
|  | George Ege (F)
| Resigned sometime in October 1797.Successor elected October 10, 1797.
|  | Joseph Hiester (DR)
| Seated December 1, 1797

|-
| 
|  | Samuel Sitgreaves (F)
| Resigned sometime in 1798.Successor elected October 9, 1798.
|  | Robert Brown (DR)
| Seated December 4, 1798

|-
| 
|  | Nathan Bryan (DR)
| Died June 4, 1798.Successor elected August 2, 1798.
|  | Richard Dobbs Spaight (DR)
| Seated December 10, 1798

|-
| 
|  | John Swanwick (DR)
| Died July 31, 1798.Successor elected October 9, 1798.
|  | Robert Waln (F)
| Seated December 3, 1798

|-
| 
|  | Joshua Coit (F)
| Died September 5, 1798.Successor elected October 22, 1798.
|  | Jonathan Brace (F)
| Seated December 3, 1798

|-
| 
|  | William Giles (DR)
| Resigned October 2, 1798.Successor elected November 1, 1798.
|  | Joseph Eggleston (DR)
| Seated December 3, 1798

|}

Committees
Lists of committees and their party leaders.

Senate

 Whole

House of Representatives

 Claims (Chairman: Dwight Foster)
 Commerce and Manufactures (Chairman: Edward Livingston then Samuel Smith)
 Elections (Chairman: Joshua Coit then Joseph B. Varnum)
 Revisal and Unfinished Business (Chairman: Jeremiah Smith then Nathaniel Macon then George Thatcher)
 Rules (Select) 
 Standards of Official Conduct
 Ways and Means (Chairman: William L. Smith then Robert Goodloe Harper)
 Whole

Joint committees

 Enrolled Bills  (Chairman: Isaac Tichenor)

Employees 
 Architect of the Capitol: William Thornton

Senate 
 Secretary: Samuel A. Otis
 Doorkeeper: James Mathers
 Chaplain: William White, Episcopalian

House of Representatives 
 Clerk: John J. Beckley, until May 15, 1797
 Jonathan W. Condy, elected May 15, 1797
 Sergeant at Arms: Joseph Wheaton
 Doorkeeper: Thomas Claxton
 Reading Clerks: 
 Chaplain: Ashbel Green, Presbyterian

See also 
 1796 United States elections (elections leading to this Congress)
 1796 United States presidential election
 1796–97 United States Senate elections
 1796–97 United States House of Representatives elections
 1798 United States elections (elections during this Congress, leading to the next Congress)
 1798–99 United States Senate elections
 1798–99 United States House of Representatives elections

Notes

References

External links
Statutes at Large, 1789-1875
Senate Journal, First Forty-three Sessions of Congress
House Journal, First Forty-three Sessions of Congress
Biographical Directory of the U.S. Congress
U.S. House of Representatives: House History
U.S. Senate: Statistics and Lists